Quercus liebmannii is a Mexican species of trees in the beech family. It has been found only in the States of Oaxaca and Puebla.

References

External links
 photo of herbarium specimen at Missouri Botanical Garden, collected in Oaxaca in 1894

liebmanii
Endemic oaks of Mexico
Flora of the Sierra Madre del Sur
Balsas dry forests
Trees of Oaxaca
Trees of Puebla
Least concern flora of North America
Plants described in 1924
Taxonomy articles created by Polbot